is a Japanese football player. He plays for Vonds Ichihara.

Career

New York Cosmos (loan)
On 11 June 2013, it was announced that Kashiwase signed with the New York Cosmos of the American North American Soccer League on loan from Shimizu S-Pulse of the J1 League. He made his debut for the Cosmos on 24 August 2013 against the San Antonio Scorpions in which he came on in the 89th minute for Alessandro Noselli as the Cosmos won the game 2–1.

Wuppertaler SV
After spending time with the Cosmos and being released by Shimizu S-Pulse, Kashiwase signed with Oberliga Niederrhein side TuRU Düsseldorf.

International
Kashiwase has played for the Japan U17 side.

Club statistics

References

External links 

 New York Cosmos Profile.

1993 births
Living people
Association football forwards
Association football people from Chiba Prefecture
Expatriate soccer players in the United States
Japanese expatriate footballers
Japanese expatriate sportspeople in the United States
Japanese footballers
Japan youth international footballers
J1 League players
J3 League players
J.League U-22 Selection players
New York Cosmos (2010) players
North American Soccer League players
Shimizu S-Pulse players
Vonds Ichihara players
Wuppertaler SV players